Chan Wing-sze (born 11 September 1983) is a Hong Kong women's professional football player.

International goals

See also
List of Hong Kong women's international footballers

References

External links 
 

Living people
Hong Kong women's footballers
Hong Kong women's international footballers
Footballers at the 2014 Asian Games
1983 births
Hong Kong women's futsal players
Women's association football midfielders
Footballers at the 2018 Asian Games
Asian Games competitors for Hong Kong